Tskhenistsqali (Cxenisċqali, also: Tskhenistskali) is a river in northern Georgia. Its source is in the main range of the Caucasus Mountains, in the easternmost part of the Lentekhi Municipality, lower Svaneti. It flows through the small towns Lentekhi and Tsageri and joins the Rioni near the town of Samtredia.
The main tributaries of Tskhenistskali are: Zsekho, Kheleldula, Janolula ( from the right ), Kobishuri, Leuseri, Khopuri (from the left).

From etymological standpoint the name is derived from the Georgian words ცხენი (Cxeni, "horse") and წყალი (Tsqali,   "water"), thereby meaning "horse water" or perhaps more precisely "horse river".

References

Rivers of Georgia (country)